Humenné District (okres Humenné (also spelled Homonna, Homonn, Humen, Harwsfalva)) is a district in
the Prešov Region of eastern Slovakia. 
Until 1920, the district was mostly part of Zemplén (county) of the Kingdom of Hungary, apart from an area to the east of Porúbka in the Vihorlat Mountains (Vihorlatské vrchy) which formed part of the county of Ung.

Municipalities

References 

Districts of Slovakia
Geography of Prešov Region